Claude-Louis Mathieu or Louis Mathieu (25 November 1783 in Mâcon – 5 March 1875 in Paris) was a French mathematician and astronomer who began his career as an engineer. He worked with the Bureau des Longitudes and tried to determine the distance of the stars.

Awarded the Lalande Prize twice, in 1808 and 1815.

References

1783 births
1875 deaths
19th-century French astronomers
Members of the French Academy of Sciences
Recipients of the Lalande Prize